Emily Temple may refer to:
Emily Temple, Viscountess Palmerston (1787–1869)
Emily Temple-Wood (born 1994), American Wikipedia editor